Neukalen is a town in the Mecklenburgische Seenplatte district, in Mecklenburg-Western Pomerania, Germany. It is situated 19 km southwest of Demmin.

History
(Old) Kalen was first mentioned in a document of 1174. After 1236, Kalen, now called Altkalen, was located on the trade route from Stettin (now Szczecin) to Rostock and it expanded as a city with a strong fortification. The city got lands and in 1253 it was granted the Lübeck law. In 1281 the city was moved for unknown reasons to Gnoien and so Neukalen was newly founded in 1281.

Personalities 

 Anke Borchmann (born 1954), rower, Olympic and double world champion

References

External links

 Official website of Neukalen (German)
 Eisenbahnmuseum Neukalen / railway museum (German)

Towns in Mecklenburg-Western Pomerania
Cities and towns in Mecklenburg
Populated places established in the 1280s
1250s establishments in the Holy Roman Empire
1253 establishments in Europe